Remigijus Lapinskas (born 1968 in Jonava) is Lithuanian business  entrepreneur and  leader of Lithuanian Green Party, green-liberal political party.

Biography 
Remigijus Lapinskas graduated in 1986 from Garliava high school.  Then he studied at Vilnius University. In 1993, he graduated from the Law Faculty.
His first business experience was  together with his friends (Andrius Janukonis etc.) from University, co-founded the company Rubicon, the basis of today's UAB ICOR. He began intensive commercial activities, the business grew to become one of the leading enterprises of Lithuania.

From 2016 to 2020, Lapinskas was president of World Bioenergy Association.

Remigijus Lapinskas is a president of the Green Policy Institute. He was the founder and president (2004-2014) of Lithuanian biomass energy association LITBIOMA, Board member in European Biomass Association (AEBIOM) from 2006 to 2010.

References 

21st-century Lithuanian politicians
21st-century Lithuanian businesspeople
20th-century Lithuanian businesspeople
Lithuanian jurists
Living people
Vilnius University alumni
1968 births
People from Jonava
People from Garliava